Tsang may refer to:

 Ü-Tsang, a traditional region of Tibet
 Tsang (surname)
 Zang (surname), romanized Tsang in Wade–Giles
 Zeng, a Chinese surname, romanized Tsang in Cantonese

See also
 Zang (disambiguation)